North Beach is a residential area in central Durban, KwaZulu-Natal, South Africa.

References

See also
 South Beach, Durban

Suburbs of Durban